Li Tang (courtesy name Xigu 晞古; c. 1050 – 1130) was a Chinese landscape painter who practised at Kaifeng and Hangzhou during the Song dynasty. He forms a link between earlier painters such as Guo Xi, Fan Kuan and Li Cheng and later artists such as Xia Gui and Ma Yuan. He perfected the technique of "axe-cut" brush-strokes.

Biography
Li Tang was born ca. 1050, a native of Heyang. Already in his early years he earned his living by painting. Sometime after 1100, under Emperor Huizong, he earned the highest rank in the Painting Academy at the court in Bianjing (now Kaifeng).

He survived the invasion by the Jurchen Jin dynasty in 1126–27, and, together with the court, moved to Qiantang (now Hangzhou), which became the capital city of the newly established Southern Song Dynasty. He continued to serve as painter in the court under Emperor Gaozong, and died circa 1130.

Character of his art

Li was among the most influential of the early Southern Song landscape artists and had many followers. He represented a vital link between the Northern Song school (Guo Xi, Fan Kuan, Li Cheng, and others), and the later Southern Song painters, such as Xia Gui and Ma Yuan, both of whom studied Li's art. He developed and perfected the technique of the so-called "ax-cut" brushstrokes, which gave rocks and mountains a particularly fine quality.

"Wind in Pines Among a Myriad Valleys"
As with most Song artists, few of Li Tang's paintings survive, and most are of questionable authorship. The large hanging scroll Wind in Pines Among a Myriad Valleys (also known as Whispering Pines in the Mountains; National Palace Museum, Taipei, Taiwan) is the only painting that bears a clear signature by the artist, which is placed on one of the peaks in the top section. It reads: "Painted by Li Tang of Ho-yang in Spring of the chia-ch'en year of the Hsüan-ho Reign of the Great Song [Dynasty]." The texture of the rocks in this painting is a standard example of the "ax-cut" strokes technique.

Other attributed works

Other works commonly attributed to Li Tang are Intimate Scenery of River and Mountains, a long landscape scroll, and Sitting on Rocks Gazing at the Mist, both in the possession of the National Palace Museum.

See also
Chinese art
Chinese painting
Culture of the Song Dynasty
History of Chinese art

Notes

References 
 Barnhart, R. M. et al. (1997). Three thousand years of Chinese painting. New Haven, Yale University Press. 
Richard Edwards: The Landscape Art of Li T'ang. Archives of the Chinese Art Society of America, Volume 12, 1958, pp. 48–60 (JSTOR)
Richard Barnhart: Li T'ang (c.1050-c.1130) and the Kōtō-In Landscapes. The Burlington Magazine, volume 114, issue 830, May 1972 (special edition for Chinese landscape painting), pp. 304–311, 313-314 (JSTOR)
Dorothy Perkins: Encyclopedia of China: History and Culture. Routledge, 2013, p. 280

External links 

Landscapes Clear and Radiant: The Art of Wang Hui (1632-1717), an exhibition catalog from The Metropolitan Museum of Art (fully available online as PDF), which contains material on Li Tang (see index)
Sung and Yuan paintings, an exhibition catalog from The Metropolitan Museum of Art Libraries (fully available online as PDF), which contains material on Li Tang (see list of paintings)
Brief biography

1130 deaths
1050s births
11th-century Chinese painters
12th-century Chinese painters
Painters from Henan
People from Jiaozuo
Song dynasty landscape painters